The following is a list of people who have served as mayor of the city of Houston in the U.S. state of Texas.

Until 2015, the term of the mayor was two years. Beginning with the tenure of Bob Lanier, the city charter imposed term limits on officeholders of no more than three terms (six years total). On November 3, 2015, voters approved Proposition 2, which extended the terms of the Mayor, City Controller and City Councilmembers to four years, while imposing a limit of two terms.

List of mayors of Houston

See also

 Timeline of Houston

References

External links
Mayor of Houston Biography
List of Houston mayors
Rulers - Houston

Houston, Texas

Mayors